This list of the Cenozoic life of Maryland contains the various prehistoric life-forms whose fossilized remains have been reported from within the US state of Maryland and are between 66 million and 10,000 years of age.

A

 †Abra – tentative report
 †Abra longicalla
 Acanthodesia
 †Acanthodesia oblongula
 †Acanthodesia savartii
 †Acantodesia
 †Acantodesia oblongula
  Acipenser
 †Acrocoelum
 †Acrocoelum richardsi – type locality for species
 Acropora
  †Acropora palmata
 Acteocina
 †Acteocina canaliculata
 Acteon
 †Acteon danicus – type locality for species
 †Acteon ovoides
 †Acus
 †Acus curvilirata
  †Adocus
  †Aepycamelus – tentative report
 Aetobatus
 †Aetobatus arcuatus
 †Aetobatus irregularis
 †Aetobatus profundus – type locality for species
  †Aglaocetus
 †Aglaocetus patulus
 Alca
 †Alca torda – or unidentified comparable form
 Aligena
 †Aligena aequata
 †Aligena elevata
 †Ambystoma
 †Ambystoma maculatum
 †Ambystoma tigrinum
 Amia
  †Amphicyon
  Amyda
 †Amyda cellulosa
 Anachis
 †Anachis avara
 Anadara
 †Anadara andrewsi
 †Anadara ovalis
 †Anadara subrostrata
 †Anadara transversa
 Anas
 †Anas crecca
 Ancilla – report made of unidentified related form or using admittedly obsolete nomenclature
 Angulus
 †Angulus agilis
 Anomia
 †Anomia aculeata
 †Anomia marylandica
 †Anomia multilineata
 †Anomia simplex
 Anticlimax – tentative report
 †Anticlimax gardnerae – type locality for species
  †Aphelops – tentative report
 †Aporrhaid
 †Aporrhaid gastropod
 Aporrhais
 †Aporrhais potomacensis
 Aquila
 †Aquila chrysaetos
 †Araeodelphis – type locality for genus
 †Araeodelphis natator – type locality for species
 †Araloselachus
 †Araloselachus cuspidata
 Arca
 †Arca callipleura
 †Arca improcera
 †Archaeohippus
 Architectonica
 †Architectonica form A informal
 †Architectonica form B informal
  †Arctodus
 †Arctodus pristinus
 Argopecten
  †Argopecten irradians
 †Armatobalanus
 †Armatobalanus calvertensis
 Arossia
 †Arossia bohaska – type locality for species
 †Arossia cummembrana – type locality for species
 †Arossia newmani
 †Asaphis
 †Asaphis centenaria
 †Aspideretoides
 †Aspideretoides virginianus
  Astarte
 †Astarte cuneiformis
 †Astarte exaltata
 †Astarte marylandica
 †Astarte obruta
 †Astarte perplana
 †Astarte thisphila
 †Astarte thomasi
 †Astarte undata
 Asterias
  †Asterias forbesi – or unidentified comparable form
 Astrangia
 †Astrangia danae
 †Astrehelia
 †Astrehelia palmata
 †Astrhelia
 †Astrhelia plamata
 †Astroscopus
  †Astroscopus countermani – type locality for species
 Astyris
 †Astyris communis
 †Astyris lunata
 Ataphrus
 †Ataphrus glandula
  Athleta
 †Athleta limopsis
 †Athleta tuomeyi
 †Atopomys
 †Atopomys texensis
 Atrina
 †Atrina harrisi
 †Atrina harrisii
  †Aulophyseter
 †Aulophyseter mediatlanticus – type locality for species

B

  Balaenoptera
 †Balaenoptera cephalus
 †Balaenoptera pusilla – type locality for species
 Balanus
 †Balanus concabvus
 †Balanus concava
  †Balanus crenatus
 †Balanus imitator
 †Balanus vulcanellus – type locality for species
 Bankia
 †Bankia gouldi
 Barnea
 †Barnea costata
 Bathytormus
 †Bathytormus alaeformis
 †Batiacasphaera
 †Batiacasphaera sphaerica
 †Belosphys
 Bicorbula
 †Bicorbula idonea
 Blarina
  †Blarina brevicauda
 †Blarina carolinensis
 †Bolis – or unidentified comparable form
 Bonasa
  †Bonasa umbellus
 Boreotrophon
 †Boreotrophon harasewychi – type locality for species
 Brachidontes
 †Brachidontes potomacensis
 †Brachyprotoma
 †Brachyprotoma obtusata
 †Brevoortia
  †Brevoortia tyrannus – or unidentified comparable form
 Buccinofusus
 †Buccinofusus chesapeakensis
 †Buccinofusus parilis
 Bufo
 †Bufo americanus
 †Bufo woodhousei
 †Bulliopsis
 †Bulliopsis marylandica
 †Bulliopsis quadrata
 Busycon – type locality for genus
 †Busycon carica
 †Busycon fusiforme
 †Busycon fusiformis
 †Busycotyphus
 †Busycotyphus coronatum
 †Busycotyphus rugosum
 Busycotypus
 †Busycotypus alveatum
 †Busycotypus asheri – type locality for species
 †Busycotypus canaliculatus
 †Busycotypus coronatum
 †Busycotypus rugosum

C

 Cadulus
 †Cadulus bellulus
 †Cadulus newtonensis
 †Cadulus thallus
 Caecum
 †Caecum patuxentium
 †Calianassa
 †Calianassa atlantica
 †Calianassa matsoni – or unidentified comparable form
 †Callinassa
 †Callinassa atlantica
 Callinectes
 †Callinectes ornatus
  †Callinectes sapidus
  Calliostoma
 †Calliostoma alphelium
 †Calliostoma aphelium
 †Calliostoma humile – or unidentified comparable form
 †Calliostoma philanthropus
 †Calliostoma philathropus
 Callista
 †Callista marylandica
 Callocardia
 †Callocardia catharia
  Calonectris
 Calyptraea
 †Calyptraea aldrichi – type locality for species
 †Calyptraea centralis
 †Calyptraphorus
 †Calyptraphorus jacksoni
 Cancellaria
 †Cancellaria alternata
 Cancer
  †Cancer irroratus
 Canis
  †Canis armbrusteri – type locality for species
 †Canis latrans
 †Canis rufus – or unidentified comparable form
 Cantharus
 †Cantharus marylandicus
 †Carassatellites
 †Carassatellites turgidulus
 Carcharhinus
 †Carcharhinus egertoni
 Carcharias
 †Carcharias collata – type locality for species
 Carcharodon
 †Carcharodon auriculatus
  †Carcharodon hastalis
 Cardita
 †Cardita protracta
 †Caricella
 Carphophis
 †Carphophis amoenus
 Caryocorbula
 †Caryocorbula cuneata
 †Caryocorbula inaqualis
 Cassis
 Castor
  †Castor canadensis
 Catapleura
 †Catapleura repanda – type locality for species
 †Cephalotropis – type locality for genus
 †Cephalotropis coronatus – type locality for species
 Cerastoderma
 †Cerastoderma leptopleurum
 Cervus
 †Cetophis – type locality for genus
 †Cetophis heteroclitus – type locality for species
  Cetorhinus
  †Cetotherium
 †Cetotherium megalophysum
 †Cetotherium parvum – type locality for species
 Chama
 †Chama corticosa
 Chelone
 Chelydra
  †Chelydra serpentina
 †Chesacardium
 †Chesacardium craticuloides
 †Chesacardium laqueatum
 †Chesaclava – type locality for genus
 †Chesaclava dissimilis
 †Chesaclava quarlesi – type locality for species
 †Chesaconavus
 †Chesaconavus chesapeakensis
 †Chesaconavus rossi
 †Chesaconcavus
 †Chesaconcavus chesapeakensis
 †Chesaconcavus myosulcatus
 †Chesaconcavus proteus
 †Chesaconcavus rossi
 †Chesaconcavus santamaria
 †Chesapecten
 †Chesapecten coccymelus
 †Chesapecten coccymeus
 †Chesapecten covepointensis
  †Chesapecten jeffersonius
 †Chesapecten madisonius
 †Chesapecten monicae
 †Chesapecten nefrens
 †Chesapecten santamaria
 †Chesasyrinx – type locality for genus
 †Chesasyrinx rotifera
 †Chesatrophon – type locality for genus
 †Chesatrophon chesapeakeanus – type locality for species
 Chlamys
 †Chlamys choctavensis
 †Chlamys sheldonae
 †Chloridella
 †Chloridella empusa
 Chrysemys
  †Chrysemys picta
 †Cimomia
 †Cimomia marylandensis – type locality for species
 Circulus – report made of unidentified related form or using admittedly obsolete nomenclature
 †Circulus form A informal
 Cirsotrema
 †Cirsotrema form A informal
 †Cirsotrema from B informal
 Clavus
 †Cleistophaeridium
 †Cleistophaeridium placacanthum
 Clementia
 †Clementia inoceriformis
 Clethrionomys
  †Clethrionomys gapperi – or unidentified comparable form
  Cliona
 †Cliona sulphurea
 †Clionia
 †Clionia sulphurea
 Coluber
  †Coluber constrictor
  Concavus
 †Concavus concavus
 †Concavus crassostricola
 Condylura
 †Condylura cristata
 Conopeum
 †Conopeum germanum
 Conus
 †Conus deluvianus
 †Conus diluvianus
 †Conus sanctaemariae – type locality for species
 Coralliophaga
 †Coralliophaga bryani
  Corbula
 †Corbula elevata
 †Corbula inaequalis
 †Corbula pectorosa – type locality for species
 †Coronia
 Crassatella
 †Crassatella aquiana
 †Crassatella marylandica
 †Crassatella melinus
 Crassostrea
 †Crassostrea virginica
 Crenilabium – or unidentified comparable form
 †Crenilabium elatum
 †Creonella
 †Creonella obscuriplica – type locality for species
 Crepidula
  †Crepidula fornicata
 †Crepidula plana
  †Cretolamna
 †Cretolamna appendiculata
 Crotalus
 †Crotalus horridus
 Crucibulum
 †Crucibulum constrictum
 †Crucibulum costata
 †Crucibulum multilineatum
  Cryptobranchus
 †Cryptobranchus guildayi – type locality for species
 Cucullaea
 †Cucullaea gigantea
 †Cucullaea transversa
 Cumingia
 †Cumingia tellinoides
 †Cybium
 Cyclocardia
 †Cyclocardia granulata
 †Cyclopsiella
 †Cyclopsiella lusatica
 Cyclostremiscus
 †Cyclostremiscus sohli – type locality for species
 Cylichna
 †Cylichna venusta – type locality for species
 Cymatosyrinx
 †Cymatosyrinx mariana – type locality for species
 †Cynarctus
 †Cynarctus marylandica – type locality for species
 †Cynarctus wangi – type locality for species
 †Cynorca – tentative report
 Cypraea
 Cyrtopleura
  †Cyrtopleura costata
 Cythara
 †Cythereis
 †Cythereis tuberculata
 Cytheridea
 †Cytheridea punctillata
 †Cytheris
 †Cytheris tuberculata

D

 †Dallarca
 †Dallarca elevata
 †Dallarca elnia
 †Dallarca idonea
 †Dallarca staminea
 †Dallarca subrostrata
  Dasyatis
 †Dasyatis centrourus – or unidentified comparable form
 †Delphinodon
 †Delphinodon dividum – type locality for species
 †Delphinodon leidyi
 Dentalium
 †Dentalium attenuatum
 †Desmathyus
 Diadophis
  †Diadophis punctatus
  Diodora
 †Diodora griscomi
 †Diodora marlboroensis
 †Diodora marylandica
 †Diodora marylandicus
 †Diodora nassula
 †Diodora redimicula
  †Diorocetus – type locality for genus
 †Diorocetus hiatus – type locality for species
 Diplodonta
 †Diplodonta marlboroensis
 †Diplodonta subvexa
 †Dipoides
 Discinisca
 †Discinisca lugubris
 †Discinisca lugubrius
 Divalinga
 †Divalinga quadrisulcata
 †Dolicholatirus
  Dosinia
 †Dosinia acetabulum
 †Dosiniopsis
 †Dosiniopsis lenticularis

E

 †Eburneopecten
 †Eburneopecten cerinus – type locality for species
 †Eburneopecten dalli
 Echinocardium
 †Echinocardium marylandiense – type locality for species
 Echinophoria – type locality for genus
 †Echinophoria caelatura
 †Ecphora
 †Ecphora chesapeakensis – type locality for species
  †Ecphora gardnerae
 †Ecphora meganae
 †Ecphora quadricostata
 †Ecphora scientistensis
 †Ecphora tampaensis
 †Ecphora tricostata
 †Ecphora turneri
 †Ectoganus
 †Ectoganus gliriformis – or unidentified comparable form
 †Ectopistes
  †Ectopistes migratorius
 Elaphe
 †Elaphe vulpina
 Electra
 †Electra monostachys
 Elphidium
 †Elphidium discoidale
 †Elphidium incertum
 †Elphidium latispatium
 Ensis
 †Ensis directus
 †Ensis ensiformis
  †Entobia
 Entosolenia
 †Entosolenia globosa
 †Entosolenia lucida
 Eontia
 †Eontia palmerae
 †Eontia ponderosa
 †Eopleurotoma – or unidentified comparable form
 †Eopleurotoma harrisi
 †Eopleurotoma potomacensis
  †Eosuchus
 †Eosuchus minor
 †Eosurcula – or unidentified comparable form
 †Eosurcula ducateli
 Epitonium
 †Epitonium angulatum
 †Epitonium chancellorensis – type locality for species
 †Epitonium denticulatum
 †Epitonium humphreysii
 †Epitonium multistriatum
 †Epitonium rupicola
 †Epitonium sayanum
 Eponides
 †Eponides frigida
 Eptesicus
 †Eptesicus fuscus – or unidentified comparable form
 Equus
 †Equus complicatus
 †Equus giganteus
 Erethizon
 †Erethizon dorsatum
  †Euceratherium
 †Euceratherium collinum
  †Euclastes – tentative report
 Eucrassatella
 †Eucrassatella melinus
 Eulima
 †Eulima brightseatensis – type locality for species
 †Eulima form A informal
 Eumeces
 †Eumeces fasciatus – or unidentified comparable form
 Eupleura
 †Eupleura caudata
  †Eurhinodelphis
 †Eurhinodelphis longirostris
 Euspira
 †Euspira heros
 †Euspira marylandica
 †Euspira tuomeyi

F

 Felis
 †Felis couguar
 †Ficopsis
 Fissurella
 †Fissurella fluviamariana – type locality for species
  †Fistulobalanus
 †Fistulobalanus klemmi
 †Florilus
 †Florilus chesapeakensis
 †Florimetis
 †Florimetis biplicata
 †Fulgar
 †Fulgar coronatum

G

  Galeocerdo
 †Galeocerdo aduncus
 †Galeocerdo appendiculatus
 †Galeocerdo contortus
 †Galeocerdo latidens
 Galeodea
 Gari
 †Gari gubernatoria
 Gastrochaena
 Gavia
  †Gavia immer
  †Gavialosuchus
 †Gavialosuchus antiquus
 Gegania
 †Gegania marylandica
 Gemma
 †Gemma gemma
 Genota – or unidentified comparable form
 †Genota bellistriata
 Geukensia
 †Geukensia demissa
 Gibbula – tentative report
 †Gibbula glandula
 †Gilbertina
 †Gilbertina texana
  Glaucomys
 Globigerina
 †Globigerina praebulloides
 Globigerinoides
 †Globigerinoides altiaperturus
 †Globigerinoides sicanus
 †Globoquadrina
 †Globoquadrina altispira
 Glossus
 †Glossus fraterna
 †Glossus ignolea – or unidentified comparable form
 †Glossus markoei
 †Glossus markoii
 †Glossus marylandica
 †Glossus mazlea
 †Glossus santamaria
 Glycimeris
 †Glycimeris parilis
 Glycymeris
 †Glycymeris americana
 †Glycymeris idonea
 †Glycymeris lentiformis
 †Glycymeris parilis
 Glyptemys
  †Glyptemys muhlenbergii
  †Gomphotherium
 †Gomphotherium obscurum – type locality for species
 †Gryphaeostrea
 †Gryphaeostrea vomer
 Gulo
  †Gulo gulo
 Gyrinophilus
 †Gyrinophilus porphyriticus – or unidentified comparable form

H

 †Habibacysta
 †Habibacysta tectata
 †Hadrodelphis – type locality for genus
 †Hadrodelphis calvertense – type locality for species
 †Halicetus – type locality for genus
 †Halicetus ignotus – type locality for species
 Haminoea
 †Haminoea solitaria
  Hastula
 †Hastula inornata
 †Hastula simplex
 Haustator
 †Haustator form A informal
 †Haustator gnoma – type locality for species
 †Haustator premortoni – type locality for species
 †Heliadornis – type locality for genus
 †Heliadornis ashbyi – type locality for species
 Hemimactra
 †Hemimactra solidissima
 †Hemimactra subparilis
 Hemipristis
  †Hemipristis serra
 †Hercoglossa
 †Hercoglossa tuomeyi – type locality for species
 †Hesperhys
  Heterodon
 †Heterodon platyrhinos – or unidentified comparable form
 Hiatella
 †Hiatella arctica
 †Hiatella artica
 Hippoporidra
 †Hippoporidra edax
  †Hippotherium
 Hyla
  †Hyla crucifer
 Hyotissa
 †Hyotissa haitensis
 Hysteroconcha
 †Hysteroconcha marylandica
 †Hysteroconcha staminaea
 †Hystrichosphaeropsis
 †Hystrichosphaeropsis obscura

I

  Ictalurus
 Ilyanassa
 †Ilyanassa obsoleta
 †Ilyanassa trivittata
 Ischadium
 †Ischadium recurvum
  †Ischyodus
 †Ischyodus williamsae – type locality for species
 Isognomon
 †Isognomon maxillata
 †Isognomon tortum
  Isurus
 †Ixacanthus – type locality for genus
 †Ixacanthus coelospondylus – type locality for species

J

 †Judithemys
 †Judithemys kranzi – type locality for species

K

 Kalolophus
 †Kalolophus antillarum
 †Kapalmerella
 †Kapalmerella mortoni
  †Kentriodon – type locality for genus
 †Kentriodon pernix – type locality for species
 †Kummelia
 †Kummelia americana
  Kuphus – report made of unidentified related form or using admittedly obsolete nomenclature
 Kurtziella
 †Kurtziella cerina

L

 †Labyrinthodinium
 †Labyrinthodinium truncatum
 †Lacinia
 †Lacinia pygmaea – type locality for species
 Lacuna
 †Lacuna feorra – type locality for species
 †Laevihastula – type locality for genus
 †Laevihastula marylandica – type locality for species
 †Laevihastula simplex
  †Lagodon
  Lamna
 †Lamna denticulata
 †Lamna obliqua
 †Lamna vincenti
 Lampropeltis
 †Lampropeltis triangulum
  Lasiopodomys
 †Lasiopodomys deceitensis
 Lenticulina
 †Lenticulina rotulata
 Lepisosteus
 †Leptomactra
 †Leptomactra delumbis
 †Leptomactra marylandica
 †Leptophoca – type locality for genus
 †Leptophoca lenis – type locality for species
 †Leptophoca proxima – or unidentified comparable form
 Lepus
  †Lepus americanus
 †Levifusus
 †Levifusus trabeatus
  Libinia
 †Libinia dubia
 †Lingulodinium
 †Lingulodinium macherophorum
 Lirophora
 †Lirophora alevata
 †Lirophora alveata
 †Lirophora latilirata
 †Lirophora parkeria
  Lithophaga – or unidentified comparable form
 †Lithophaga marylandica
 Littoraria
 †Littoraria irrorata
 Lontra
  †Lontra canadensis
 †Lophocetus
 †Lophocetus calvertensis – type locality for species
 †Lophocetus pappus – type locality for species
 †Lophochelys – tentative report
 Lopholatilus
 Loxoconcha
 †Loxoconcha impressa
 Lucina – report made of unidentified related form or using admittedly obsolete nomenclature
 Lucina
 †Lucina dartoni
 †Lucina whitei
 Lucinoma
 †Lucinoma contracta
 †Lucinoma filosa
 Lunatia
 †Lunatia catenoides
 Lyonsia
 †Lyonsia hyalina

M

 Macoma
  †Macoma balthica
 †Macoma calcarea
 Macrocallista
 †Macrocallista marylandica
 †Macrocallista subimpressa
 †Macrokentriodon – type locality for genus
 †Macrokentriodon morani – type locality for species
 Mactrodesma
 †Mactrodesma subponderosa
 †Mactrodesma subponderosum
 †Mammut
 †Mammut americanum
 †Mammuthus
  †Mammuthus columbi
  †Mammuthus primigenius
  Marginella
 †Marginella minuta
 †Mariacolpus – type locality for genus
 †Mariacolpus plebeia
 †Mariadrillia – type locality for genus
 †Mariadrillia parvoidea
 †Mariafusus – type locality for genus
 †Mariafusus marylandica
 †Marianarona – type locality for genus
 †Marianarona asheri – type locality for species
 †Marianarona marylandica – type locality for species
 †Mariasalpinx – type locality for genus
 †Mariasalpinx emilyae – type locality for species
 †Mariasveltia – type locality for genus
 †Mariasveltia lunata
 †Mariaturricula – type locality for genus
 †Mariaturricula biscatenaria
 Marmota
  †Marmota monax
 Martesia
 †Martesia cuneiformis
 †Martesia ovalis
 †Marvacrassatella
 †Marvacrassatella marylandica
 †Marvacrassatella melina
 †Marvacrassatella turgidula
 Massilina
 †Massilina marylandica
 Mathilda
 †Mathilda crebricosta – type locality for species
 †Mathilda form A informal
 †Mathilda form B informal
 †Mathilda form C informal
 †Mathilda kauffmani – type locality for species
 †Mathilda marylandensis – type locality for species
 †Medoriopsis
 †Medoriopsis marylandica
  †Megalonyx
  Megaptera
 †Megaptera expansa – type locality for species
 Melampus
 †Melampus bidentatus
 Melanitta
 †Melanitta deglandi
 Meleagris
  †Meleagris gallopavo
 †Melosia
 †Melosia staminea
 Membranipora
 †Membranipora flabellata
 Menestho
 †Menestho form A informal
 Mephitis
 †Mephitis mephitis
 Mercenaria
 †Mercenaria blakei
 †Mercenaria campechiensis
 †Mercenaria cuneata – type locality for species
 †Mercenaria ducatelli – tentative report
  †Mercenaria mercenaria
 †Mercenaria plena
 †Mercenaria staminea
 †Mercenaria subcuneata
 †Mercenaria tetrica
 Meretrix
 †Meretrix subimpressa
  †Merychippus
 †Mesocetus
 †Mesocetus siphunculus
 †Mesorhytis – tentative report
 †Mesorhytis pomonkensis
 †Mesorhytis potomacensis
 †Messapicetus
 †Messapicetus longirostris
  †Metaxytherium
 †Metaxytherium crataegense – type locality for species
 †Micropogon
 †Micropogon undulatus
 Microtus
 †Microtus chrotorrhinus – or unidentified comparable form
 †Microtus guildayi
 †Microtus involutus – or unidentified comparable form
  †Microtus pennsylvanicus
 Mictomys
 †Mictomys borealis
 Miltha
 †Miltha aquiana
 †Miocepphus
 †Miocepphus bohaskai – type locality for species
 †Miocepphus mcclungi
  †Miracinonyx
 †Miracinonyx inexpectatus
 Mitra
 †Mitra marylandica
 Modiolus
 †Modiolus dalli
 †Modiolus ducatelli
 †Modiolus ducatellii
  †Modiolus modiolus
 †Modiolus potomacensis – type locality for species
 †Moira – tentative report
 †Moira atropos
 †Monotherium
 †Monotherium affine
 Morus
 †Morus avitus – type locality for species
 Mulinia
 †Mulinia lateralis
 Mustela
  †Mustela vison – or unidentified comparable form
 †Mya
 †Mya arenaria
 Myliobatis
 †Myliobatis dixoni – type locality for species
 †Myliobatis frangens – type locality for species
 †Myliobatis fremenvillii – or unidentified comparable form
 †Myliobatis gigas
 †Myliobatis pachyodon
 †Myliobatis vicomicanus
  †Mylohyus
 †Mylohyus fossilis – type locality for species
 †Mylohyus obtusidens
 Myodes
 Myotis
  †Myotis grisescens – or unidentified comparable form
 Myrtea – tentative report
 †Myrtea astartiformis
 †Myrtea uhleri
 Mysella
 †Mysella planulata
 Mytilus
 †Mytilus incurvus

N

 †Nanosiren – tentative report
 Napaeozapus
  †Napaeozapus insignis
 Narona
 †Narona potomacensis
 Nassa
  Nassarius
 †Nassarius peralta
 †Nassarius vibex
 Nemocardium
 †Nemocardium lene
  Neofiber
 Neotoma – type locality for genus
  †Neotoma floridana
 †Neotoma spelaea – type locality for species
 Nerodia
  †Nerodia sipedon
 Neverita
 †Neverita asheri – type locality for species
 †Neverita cliftonensis
 †Neverita discula – type locality for species
 †Neverita duplicatus
 †Neverita potomacensis – type locality for species
 †Nodisurculina – type locality for genus
 †Nodisurculina engonata
 Noetia
 †Noetia carolinensis
 Nonion
 †Nonion calvertensis
 †Nonion pompilioides
 †Nonion sloanii
 Notidanus
 †Notidanus primigeneus
 †Notidanus primigenius
 Notophthalmus
  †Notophthalmus viridescens – or unidentified comparable form
 Notorynchus
  †Notorynchus cepedianus – type locality for species
 Novocrania
 †Novocrania lububris
 Nucula
 †Nucula potomacensis
 †Nucula proxima
 †Nucula prunicola
 †Nucula taphria
 Nuculana
 †Nuculana acuta
 †Nuculana cliftonensis
 †Nuculana cultelliformis
 †Nuculana improcera
 †Nuculana liciata
 †Nuculana luciata
 †Nuculana parilis
 †Nuculana tysoni

O

 Ochotona
  †Ochotona princeps – or unidentified comparable form
 Odocoileus
  †Odocoileus virginianus
  Odontaspis
 †Odontaspis actutissima
 †Odontaspis acutissima
 †Odontaspis hopei
 †Odontaspis littoralis
 †Odontaspis macrota
 †Odontaspis verticalis
 †Odontaspis winkleri
 †Odontopolys
 Odostomia
 †Odostomia insignifica
 †Ogivalina
 †Ogivalina parvula
 Ondatra
 †Ondatra annectens
 †Ondatra zibethicus
 †Operculodinium
 †Operculodinium centrocarpum
 †Operculodinium piaseckii
 Opheodrys
 †Opheodrys vernalis
 Ophiura
 †Ophiura marylandica
  †Orycterocetus
 †Orycterocetus crocodilinus
 †Osteopygis
 †Osteopygis roundsi
 Ostrea
 †Ostrea alepidota
 †Ostrea carolinensis
 †Ostrea trachydiscus – type locality for species
 †Otodus
 †Otodus angustidens – tentative report
  †Otodus megalodon
 Otus
 †Otus guildayi – type locality for species
 †Oxyrhina
 †Oxyrhina cuspidata
 †Oxyrhina desorii
 †Oxyrhina elegans
 †Oxyrhina retroflexa
 †Oxyrhina sillimani

P

 Pagurus
  †Pagurus pollicaris
  †Palaeocarcharodon
 †Palaeocarcharodon orientalis
 †Palaeocystodinium
 †Palaeocystodinium golzowense
  †Palaeophis
 †Palaeophis grandis
 †Pamicellaria
 †Pamicellaria convoluta
 Pandora
 †Pandora gouldiana
 Panopea
 †Panopea americana
 †Panopea elongata
 †Panopea goldfussi
 †Panopea goldfussii
 †Panopea whitfieldi
 Panopeus
 †Panopeus herbstii
 Panthera
  †Panthera leo
 †Panthera onca
 Paraconcavus
 †Paraconcavus rooseveltensis
 †Paramya
 †Paramya subovata
 Parascalops
 †Parascalops breweri
  †Parietobalaena – type locality for genus
 †Parietobalaena palmeri – type locality for species
 Parvilucina
 †Parvilucina crenulata
 †Parvilucina multistriata
 †Pasitheola
 †Pasitheola marylandensis – type locality for species
 Pecten
 †Pecten humphreysii
 †Pecten marylandica
 Pekania
 †Pekania diluviana – type locality for species
 †Pelocetus – type locality for genus
 †Pelocetus calvertensis – type locality for species
 †Pelodelphis – type locality for genus
 †Pelodelphis gracilis – type locality for species
 †Pentadinium
 †Pentadinium latincinctum – or unidentified comparable form
 Periploma – tentative report
 Perisoreus
  †Perisoreus canadensis
 Peromyscus
 †Peromyscus cumberlandensis
 †Peromyscus leucopus – or unidentified comparable form
 †Petauristodon
 †Petauristodon alpinus – or unidentified comparable form
  Petricola
 †Petricola calvertensis
 †Petricola pholadiformis
 Phacoides
 †Phacoides anodonata
 †Phacoides contractus
  †Phenacodus – tentative report
 †Phenacomya
 †Phenacomya petrosa
 Phenacomys
 †Phocageneus
 †Phocageneus venustus
 Pholadomya
 †Pholadomya marylandica
 †Physeterula
 Physodon
 †Physodon triqueter
 Pinna
  Pipistrellus
  Pitar
 †Pitar morrhuanus
 †Pitar ovatus
 †Pitar pyga
 †Pitar subnasuta
 Pitymys
 †Pitymys cumberlandensis
 Placopecten
 †Placopecten clintonius
 †Placopecten marylandica
 †Placopecten virginiana
 Platidia
 †Platidia marylandica – type locality for species
  †Platygonus
 †Platygonus cumberlandensis
 †Platygonus intermedius – type locality for species
 †Platygonus tetragonus
 †Platygonus vetus
 Plecotus
 †Plecotus alleganiensis – type locality for species
  Plethodon
 †Plethodon gultinosus
 Pleurotomella
 †Pleurotomella bellistriata – type locality for species
 †Pliorhytis
 †Pliorhytis centenaria
 Pogonias
  †Pogonias cromis – or unidentified comparable form
 †Poliniciella – type locality for genus
 †Poliniciella marylandica – type locality for species
 Polydora
 Polystira
 †Polystira barretti
 †Polystira communis
 Poromya
 †Poromya subovata
 †Praeorbulina
 †Praeorbulina glomerosa
  †Presbyornis
 †Presbyornis isoni – type locality for species
  †Prionodon
 †Prionodon egertoni
  Prionotus
 †Prionotus evolans – or unidentified related form
 †Priscodelphinus
 †Priscodelphinus acutidens – type locality for species
 †Priscodelphinus atropius – type locality for species
 †Priscodelphinus conradi
 †Priscodelphinus stenus – type locality for species
 †Priscodelphinus uraeus
 †Priscoficus
 †Priscoficus arguta
 Propebela
 †Propebela marylandica – type locality for species
 †Propebela parva
 Prophaethon – tentative report
 †Prosthennops
 †Prosthennops niobrarensis
 †Prosthennops xiphodonticus
 †Protocardia
 †Protocardia virginiana
 Pseudacris
  †Pseudacris triseriata
 †Pseudoaptyxis
 †Pseudoaptyxis sanctaemariae – type locality for species
 †Pseudocepphus – type locality for genus
 †Pseudocepphus teres – type locality for species
 Pseudoliva
 †Pseudoliva longicostata – type locality for species
 †Pseudoliva tuberculifera
 Pseudomalaxis – or unidentified comparable form
 †Pseudomalaxis ripleyana
 †Pseudophorus
 †Pseudophorus calvertensis – type locality for species
 †Pseudotrition
 †Pseudotrition ruber
 Pteria
 †Ptychosalpinx
 †Ptychosalpinx altilis
 †Ptychosalpinx multirugata
 †Ptychosalpinx pustulosus – type locality for species
  Puffinus
 †Puffinus conradi – type locality for species
 Pycnodonte
 †Pycnodonte percrassa
 †Pyropsis – tentative report

Q

  Quinqueloculina
 †Quinqueloculina flexuosa
 †Quinqueloculina seminula

R

 †Rana
  †Rana clamitans
 †Rana pipiens
 †Rana sylvatica
 Rangia
 †Rangia cuneata
 Ranzania
 †Reticulatosphaera
 †Reticulatosphaera actinocoronata
 Retusa
 †Retusa conulus
 †Retusa marylandica
 †Retusa sylvaerupis
 †Rhabdosteus – type locality for genus
 †Rhabdosteus latiradix – type locality for species
 Rhinoptera
  Rhynchobatus
 †Rhynchobatus pristinus
 †Roccus
  †Roccus saxatilis
 †Rotalia
 †Rotalia beccardi
 †Rotalia beccarii

S

 Saccella
 †Saccella parva
 Salamandra
 †Salamandra opaca
 †Sangamona
 †Sangamona fugitiva
 †Scala
 †Scala marylandica
  †Scaldicetus
  †Scapanorhynchus
 †Scapanorhynchus subulatus – tentative report
 Scaphander
 †Scaphander potomacensis – type locality for species
 Scaphella – type locality for genus
 †Scaphella solitaria
 †Scaphella virginiana
 Sceloporus
 †Sceloporus undulatus – or unidentified comparable form
  †Schizodelphis
 †Schizodelphis barnesi
 †Schizodelphis sulcatus
 Schizoporella
  †Schizoporella unicornis
 Sciaenops
 †Sciaenops eastmani
 Sciuropterus
 †Sciuropterus volans
 Sciurus
 †Sciurus carolinensis
 †Scutella
 †Scutella aberti
 †Sediliopsis – type locality for genus
 †Sediliopsis gracilis
 Seila
 †Seila adamsii
 Semele – tentative report
 Semele
 †Semele carinata
 †Semele subovata
 Serpulorbis
 †Serpulorbis granifera
 †Serpulorbis graniferus
 †Sigmesalia
 †Sigmesalia palmerae – type locality for species
  Siphonalia
 †Siphonalia devexus
 †Siphonalia potomacensis – type locality for species
 †Siphonocetus
 †Siphonocetus clarkianus
 †Siphonocetus priscus
  †Smilodon
 †Smilodon fatalis
 †Smilodontopis
 †Smilodontopis mooreheadi
 Solariorbis
 †Solariorbis form A informal
 †Solariorbis laurelae – type locality for species
 †Solariorbis lipara
 †Solarium
 †Solarium trilineatum
 Solecardia
 †Solecardia cossmani
 Solen
 Sorex
  †Sorex cinereus
 †Sorex fumeus
 Spermophilus
  †Spermophilus tridecemlineatus
 †Sphaerula
 †Sphaerula subvexa
 Sphenia – tentative report
 †Sphyraenodus
 †Sphyraenodus speciosus
  Sphyrna
 †Sphyrna laevissima – type locality for species
 †Sphyrna magna
 †Sphyrna prisca
 Spilogale
  †Spilogale putorius – type locality for species
 †Spiniferites
 †Spiniferites mirabilis
 Spiroplectammina
 †Spiroplectammina spinosa
 Spisula
 †Spisula subcuneata
  †Squalodon
 †Squalodon atlanticus
 †Squalodon calvertensis – type locality for species
 †Squalodon mento – type locality for species
 †Squalodon protervus
 †Squalodon whitmorei
 †Squalodon wymanii – type locality for species
  Squatina
 †Squatina occidentalis – type locality for species
 Squilla
  †Squilla empusa
 †Stenasodelphis – type locality for genus
 †Stenasodelphis russellae – type locality for species
 Stewartia
 †Stewartia anodonta
 †Stewartia foremani
 Sthenorytis
 †Sthenorytis pachypleura
 Stramonita
 †Stramonita haemostoma
 †Strepsidura
 Strioterebrum
 †Strioterebrum dislocatum
 Stylopoma
 †Stylopoma spongites
 †Sumatradinium
 †Sumatradinium druggii
 †Syllomus
 †Syllomus aegyptiacus – type locality for species
 Sylvilagus
 †Sylvilagus floridanus
 Synaptomys
  †Synaptomys cooperi
 †Synechodus
 †Synechodus clarki
 †Synechodus clarkia
 Syrnola
 †Syrnola toulmini – type locality for species

T

 Tagelus
 †Tagelus plebeius
 Tamias
  †Tamias striatus
 Tamiasciurus
 †Tamiasciurus hudsonicus
 †Taphrosphys
 †Taphrosphys miocenica – type locality for species
 †Tapiravus
 †Tapiravus validus – or unidentified comparable form
  Tapirus
 †Tapirus haysii – or unidentified comparable form
  †Tasbacka
 †Tasbacka ruhoffi – type locality for species
 Taxidea
 †Taxidea taxus – type locality for species
 †Tectatodinium
 †Tectatodinium pellitum
 Teinostoma
 †Teinostoma barryi
 †Teinostoma umbilicatum
 Tellina
 †Tellina virginiana
 †Tellina williamsi
 Terebra
 †Terebra inornata
 Terebratula
 †Terebratula marylandica – type locality for species
 Teredo
 †Teredo virginiana
 Terrapene
  †Terrapene carolina
 Testudo
 †Testudo ducateli – type locality for species
  Textularia
 †Textularia ultimainflata
 Thamnophis
  †Thecachampsa
 †Thecachampsa antiqua
 †Thecachampsa marylandica – type locality for species
 †Thinocetus
 †Thinocetus arthritus
  Thomomys – type locality for genus
 †Thomomys potomacensis – type locality for species
 Thracia
 †Thracia conradi
 Torcula
 †Torcula variabilis
 †Tornatellaea
 †Tornatellaea texana
 Torquesia
 †Torquesia prehumerosa – type locality for species
  Tremarctos
 †Tremarctos floridanus
 †Tretosphys
 †Tretosphys lacertosus – type locality for species
 †Tretosphys ruschenbergeri – type locality for species
 Triloculina
 †Triloculina rotunda
 Trionyx – report made of unidentified related form or using admittedly obsolete nomenclature
 †Trionyx halophilus
 Triphora
 †Triphora tricincta
 Tritonium
 †Tritonium centrosum – type locality for species
 Trochita
 †Trochita aperta
 †Trygon
 †Trygon dux
 †Tuba – tentative report
 †Tuberculodinium
 †Tuberculodinium vancampoae
 Tudicla – or unidentified comparable form
 Turricula – report made of unidentified related form or using admittedly obsolete nomenclature
 †Turrifulgur – type locality for genus
 †Turrifulgur turriculus – type locality for species
  Turris – report made of unidentified related form or using admittedly obsolete nomenclature
 †Turris piscatavensis
 †Turris tysoni
  Turritella
 †Turritella alticostata
 †Turritella exaltata
 †Turritella humerosa
 †Turritella indenta
 †Turritella indentata
 †Turritella plebeius
 †Turritella plebeua
 †Turritella potomacensis
 †Turritella subponderosa
 †Turritella subvariabilis
 †Turritella terebriformis
  Tursiops
 Typhis
 †Typhis acuticosta

U

 Umbraculum – tentative report
 Urosalpinx
 †Urosalpinx cinerea
 †Urosalpinx subrusticus
 Ursus
  †Ursus americanus

V

 Venericardia
 †Venericardia ascia
 †Venericardia potapacoensis
 †Venericardia regia
  Vespertilio
 †Vespertilio grandis
 Vitrinella
 †Vitrinella clarkmartini – type locality for species
 Volutifusus
 †Volutifusus acus – type locality for species
 †Volutifusus asheri – type locality for species
 †Volutifusus marylandicus – type locality for species
 †Volutifusus meganucleus – type locality for species
 †Volutifusus mutabilis
 Volvulella
 Vulpes

X

 Xestoleberis
  †Xiphiacetus
 †Xiphiacetus bossi – type locality for species
 †Xiphiacetus cristatus – type locality for species
 Xiphias
 †Xiphias radiata – tentative report

Y

 Yoldia
 †Yoldia laevis
  †Yoldia limatula
 †Yoldia potomacensis
 †Yolida

Z

 †Zarhachis – type locality for genus
 †Zarhachis crassangulum – type locality for species
 †Zarhachis flagellator – type locality for species
 †Zarhachis tysonii – type locality for species
 †Zikkuratia
 †Zikkuratia danica – type locality for species
 †Zizyphinus
 †Zizyphinus bryanii – type locality for species

References
 

Cenozoic
Maryland